Mikulík is Czech-language surname derived from a given name, a diminutive of "Mikuláš" ("Nicholas"). Notable people with this surname include:

 Joe Mikulik (born 1963), American baseball player and manager
 Milan Mikulík, Czech ice hockey player

See also
 Kulik (surname)
 Mikulak

Czech-language surnames
Surnames from given names